Linda Georgina (Gina) Haley (born April 23, 1975, in Mexico) is an American singer-songwriter.

Haley is the youngest child of rock and roll pioneer Bill Haley from his marriage to his last wife, Martha; she grew up in Harlingen, and she was only five years old when her father died in 1981. At 18 years old, she left home and set out to find her musical identity, which landed her in Houston.

She is classically trained on piano and an accomplished self-taught guitarist and songwriter.  During the mid-1990s, she left Houston and moved to Los Angeles.
She managed to catch the eye of producer Michael Sembello, and worked closely with him writing, recording, and arranging tracks which appeared in television and movies. Gina also worked closely with songwriter Richard Rudolph, and published songs through Music Sales Group. Her first self-titled album was released in Japan in 1999 Heat Wave.
During these years in Los Angeles, she sang with the world music group called The Bridge, whose members included Edu Falcao, Daniel Jobim, Paulinho Da Costa, Vincent Colaiuta, and Michael Sembello.

Gina later formed her own group, the Gina Haley Band, and continues to work in the musical field in her home state of Texas.

On July 6, 2005, she performed with her father's old band, The Comets at the Viper Room in West Hollywood as part of 50th-anniversary celebrations of her father's famous song "Rock Around the Clock" reaching the number-one position on American sales charts, as well as what would have been Bill Haley's 80th birthday.

In June 2008, the Gina Haley Band performed at the Bill Haley induction to the South Texas Music Walk of Fame in Corpus Christi, Texas. Other inductees included Chelo Silva, Pat Grogan, Joe Gallardo, Max Stalling, and The Reverend Horton Heat.
Meeting Jim Heath (Reverend Horton Heat) was an important event in Gina's life. Jim had not intended to perform at the induction ceremony, as his band had not traveled with him, but decided to dedicate a Bill Haley song to Gina, a song that inspired him to become a musician. That song was "Rock the Joint". After years of contemplating making a rockabilly album, Gina had finally decided that it was time to carry on her father's legacy. A year later she sang "Rock the Joint" with Reverend Horton Heat at a concert in Dallas, Texas. She continues to perform in Texas with the Gina Haley Band, in her original alternative country sound.

References

 

1975 births
Living people
American women singer-songwriters 
American musicians of Mexican descent
Mexican emigrants to the United States
People from Harlingen, Texas
Bill Haley
21st-century American singers
21st-century American women singers
Hispanic and Latino American musicians
Singer-songwriters from Texas